Kim Jong-un (born 8 January 1982) has been the supreme leader of North Korea since the death of Kim Jong-il, the previous leader and his father.

On 15 April 2012, the centenary of the birth of North Korea's first leader Kim Il-sung, Kim Jong-un made his first major public speech, entitled Let Us March Forward Dynamically Towards Final Victory, Holding Higher the Banner of Songun. At least two works predate this speech. To All the Service Personnel and People Who Deeply Mourned the Death of Comrade is dated 26 March.  Kim published Let Us Brilliantly Accomplish the Revolutionary Cause of Juche, Holding Kim Jong Il in High Esteem as the Eternal General Secretary of Our Party shortly before the 11 April Fourth Conference of the Workers' Party of Korea, which conferred on Kim Jong-il the posthumous title "Eternal General Secretary". The Great Kim Il Sung Is the Eternal Leader of Our Party and Our People, also from 2012 and probably ghostwritten, runs through the achievements of both Kim Jong-il and Kim Il-sung in a "panegyric" fashion.

Kim did not deliver a traditional New Year Address in 2012 out of respect for Kim Jong-il who had died just a short time ago. He did, however, revive the tradition the following year; Kim Jong-il never spoke in public but chose to have new year's editorials published in newspapers. In an unofficial hierarchy of speeches by the leader of North Korea, these New Year Addresses are second to only speeches made at major party events. Kim's New Year Addresses, and other works, have largely phased out mentions of the Juche ideology.

Two collections have been published: Towards Final Victory includes works from 2012, and For Building a Thriving Nation, covering the years 2013 and 2014.

In North Korea, Kim Jong-un's works are hailed as guidance and are featured in visual propaganda.

Bibliography

See also

Kim Il-sung bibliography
Kim Jong-il bibliography

References

Works cited

External links

Kim Jong-un – speeches and statements at the National Committee on North Korea
Supreme Leader's Activities – Works  at Korean Central News Agency
Descriptions of the works at Naenara
Audio excerpts at Voice of Korea

Bibliographies by writer
Kim Jong-un
Communist books